Veliki Brat 2011 (commonly known as Veliki Brat 4 or VB4 for short) was the fourth season of the Serbian production of the Big Brother reality television series Veliki Brat. This season was notable for being the first to feature houseguests from Croatia, and in doing so it holds the record for largest number of unique nations represented with five. Along with Serbia and Croatia, the other three nations represented were Montenegro, Bosnia and Herzegovina, and North Macedonia. The program is known as Big Brother in Croatia due to a former Croatian Big Brother series that aired for five seasons which was not affiliated with Veliki Brat.

The season began airing on 13 March 2011, marking the first time that the regular season was broadcast on Pink TV.

Production

Trailer and subtitles
For the first time, a trailer was produced for the show. It features housemates from previous seasons, dressed in uniforms, attending VB - Škola za poznate (Big Brother's school of fame). Hosts of the show are also featured as teachers, and Boki 13, from season 4 of the celebrity version, appears at the end of the video. The trailer premiered on YouTube.

Despite most of the press dubbing the season "School of fame", the official slogan was "Ljubi bližnjeg svog" (Love thy neighbor). A second teaser trailer was released a few weeks before the show; this one featuring falling flowers, spelling out "Ljubi bližnjeg svog" (similar to the one used in British Big Brother 11).

Auditions
Auditions took place from December 2010 to January 2011. Applications were submitted via SMS, telephone or online formhosted by Emotion. In Croatia, auditions were open for everyone, with no previous application needed.

The first casting was held in Podgorica on 24 December 2010. The day after, auditions were held simultaneously in Sarajevo and Skopje. The first round of auditions concluded in Banja Luka.

The second round of auditions were held in Croatia, with over 5,500 people applying. They lasted six days in three cities: Zagreb, Rijeka and Split. The final round of casting was held in Serbia, with auditions in Čačak, Užice, Niš, Novi Sad, Kragujevac and Belgrade, between 14 January 2011 and 23 January 2011.

Censorship 
Previously, each of the regular seasons were broadcast on B92 (a Serbian television broadcaster), while some of the celebrity editions were shown on Pink TV. This was the first time that Pink aired a regular season.

There was much speculation about who would host the show; many celebrities were tipped, including Nataša Bekvalac and Severina Vučković. Eventually, the producers announced Antonija Blaće as the host of the show, as well as Marijana Mićić who was confirmed only a few days before the launch.

At the end of February 2011, Pink was criticized for having too many reality programs, with participants becoming more inappropriate than the previous ones. The Serbian Broadcasting Agency warned both the broadcasters and the producers that there would be zero tolerance on violence, racism and hate speech, stating that they would be kept under supervision.

The production company Emotion said that they would minimize content that could be considered harmful and that live streaming would be delayed by a few minutes. For the first time, the show was marked as unsuitable for viewers under 18, but the age limit was later lowered to 15.

Big Brother's relationship with the housemates
Big Brother could talk to the housemates in two ways:

Through the speakers
Big Brother could talk to the housemates through the speakers to: announce the start or end of tasks, inform about punishments, or call a housemate to the diary room.

In the Diary room
Big Brother's relationship with the housemates while in the Diary room was more intimate. He would ask different questions and be more emotive.

Big Brother's voice
Although more than one voice actor played Big Brother, their voices were filtered to sound robotic and inhuman. Due to the robotic voice, housemates had the impression that Big Brother was one person watching them constantly.

Broadcasting

Companion shows

Big Brother's Colosseum

For the first time, Big Brother's Big Brain was not broadcast. In previous years, various companion shows were broadcast with Big Brain remaining a constant fixture.

That year a new show was produced: Big Brother's Colosseum, a game show in which the winning housemate got to be the House Captain. The House Captain was immune to nominations, and the nominations that housemates place were worth double. The show was hosted by Marijana Mićić and Maca.

The show was canceled halfway through the season, as two housemates (Dražen and Soraja) were injured during one of the games. Dražen was hospitalized and had to leave the show.

Call on Big Brother

Pozovite Velikog brata (English: Call on Big Brother) was a new show, hosted by Irina Radović (a former host of Big Brother's Big Brain). It was a phone-in morning show, wherein Irina and a guest would receive calls from viewers who commented on what happened in the house recently. Some guests were family members of the housemates, while others included psychologists, an astrologist, and some of the evicted housemates.

Halfway through the season, Irina signed a contract with Prva Srpska Televizija and had to leave Pink TV, so Marijana took her place.

Eye and the house
Producers changed the design of the eye logo. This season used the British Big Brother 2010 logoan eye composed of flowers and petals, with a slight color difference. The opening credits were changed as well; the music stayed the same, but the intro was also taken from the 2010 British seriew, although slightly altered.

The house itself remained the same, consisting of the kitchen and dining room, living room, bedroom, toilet, and garden. There were a few changes though: the walls of the showers were transparent, the swimming pool was now placed inside the house. Notably, all 16 beds were merged, with the mattresses and pillows sewn together. Also, there was just one large bed cover. For the first time, there was a smoking booth which housemates could enter one at a time.

Next to the house, the Dumps, a secret area, was built.

The following celebrity season Veliki Brat VIP 5 used the same logo and titles.

The twists

Prize Fund
The prize fund for this season increased from €100,000 to €150,000. However, a penalty system was introduced, wherein any infraction of the Big Brother rules resulted in money from the prize fund being taken away. Moreover, the weekly shopping budget would also be decreased. Ultimately, the winner was rewarded €104,000.

The Dumps
The Dumps, a yard full of garbage, was a secret place in which some housemates lived. Housemates lived in an old bus and had an old car acting as a Diary Room. In the second week, a so-called "ninja" (Radašin) entered the Dumps. His task was to obey housemates and to bring them things they wanted from the main house, being careful not to reveal the secret place.

Poisonous arrow
Housemates could be hit with a "poisonous arrow". Big Brother would decide to do something to the housemate who was hit. For instance, in week 1, Ema was hit with a poisonous arrow by Duško (who was evicted from the main house to the Dumps). Big Brother then decided to take all of Ema's personal belongings. In the second week, Bojana was hit by an arrow from Soraja and had to do all of the house chores by herself.

The Lioness
On day 49, the Lioness conquered Big Brother, who became her servant and kidnapped the male housemates (Duško, Horvat, Lester, Nemeš, Nikola, Nirmal and Radiša) and placed them in her cave, known as the Lioness' Cave. She would train the boys with the aim to increase their attractiveness. The Lioness told the female housemates (Bojana, Ema, Marijana and Soraja) that they would have the chance to save some of the men. For every one saved, they would receive €81 for their weekly budget.

Indecent proposal
During week 9's eviction, Big Brother offered housemates the chance for one evicted housemate to return in exchange for €35,000 from the prize fund. They had to unanimously decide whether to accept or reject the proposal. Though Duško, Brandon, and Antonia initially rejected the indecent proposal, they eventually agreed to the offer. Upon accepting the deal, housemates then entered the Diary Room, one by one, to vote for the housemate they wanted back in the house. Having received the most votes to re-enter, Ema was returned to the Big Brother House.

Housemates

Weekly summary

Voting history
The public voted whom to save from nomination. The three housemates with the lowest number of votes would be up for eviction. The housemates would then vote on whom to evict, with the first vote receiving two points and the second one point. The housemate with the most points was evicted. This year introduced a House Captain and a Dumps Captain who were immune from eviction and voted with double eviction points (the first vote receiving four points and the second two points.) The House Captain was awarded to the housemates residing in the main House while the Dumps Captain was awarded to the housemates who reside in the Dumps.

Notes

 The Housemates performed the nominations, but Big Brother decides which of the nominees would be evicted.
 Instead of being evicted, Duško was moved to the Dumps.
 Regular nominations, but the Housemates from the Dumps decide who will join them.
 The audience nominations housemates, and the housemates decide who will be evicted.
 All Housemates participated in the nominations, including the nominees and ones in the Dumps.
 Housemates from the Dumps, along with George, Nemeš and Ema (Red Team), competed against the other housemates (White Team) and won. As a reward, the Red Team received immunity and moved to the House. The losers moved to the Dumps and were nominated, except for Bojana, who received immunity for being the Dumps Captain.
 The public nominated housemates from the Dumps. All housemates decided who was evicted.
 Housemates from the House formed the Red Team, while the Housemates from the Dumps formted the Blue Team. The Blue Team won the competition in the Colosseum, was moved to the House and received immunity, while the Red Team had to move back to the Dumps and got nominated. Nemeš received immunity as the leader of the team. The public nominated three housemates from the Dumps, and the housemates decided who was to be evicted.
 Dražen was exempt from the House because he was injured during the Colosseum and ended up in a hospital.
 For Easter, Big Brother revealed only two nominated ones, the third one was the person X. Housemates had to nominate the third person as X so their identity would remain secret until the end. It was revealed that Tamara was X by Nemeš, the Head of the Household.
 As a part of the week task, Soraja, Horvat, Duško, Lester, Nikola and Ema received immunity for being a part of the European Union. Tamara and Bojana were exempt in these nominations and received one nomination as a punishment from Big Brother because of talking about nominations. In these nominations the Housemates nominated and the public decides who will be evicted.
 Vladimir and Antonia were nominated by Big Brother because of fighting. They were also banned from nominations. Brandon received immunity for being a new housemate.
 Nominations were held by throwing cakes in housemates' faces. Housemates did the nominations; the public decided who was to leave the house.
 Housemates accepted the offer from Big Brother to trade €35,000 in return for an evicted housemate. Housemates voted on who would return and chose Ema. Horvat's votes as the Head of Household were equal to others' votes. Antonija was banned from voting for being under the influence of Nemeš and Marijana to return George in the House.
 Nirmal received immunity for being Soraja's runner up in the battle for the House Captain.
 False public nominations. Falsely nominated were Nemeš, Brandon and Marijana.
 Marijana was automatically nominated for covering her microphone. She and Nemeš were also banned from nominations. Housemates nominated Brandon, Nemeš and Nirmal. The public decided who would leave the house.
 Brandon was evicted and nominated with the guest housemates for return. The public decided that Brandon should return to the House.
 Lester, Nikola and Nirmal received immunity and direct entry to the Final due to winning the Balkan Song Contest 2. Marijana and Nemeš were still banned from nominations.
 The housemates nominated and the public chose who would be evicted. Lester, Nikola and Nirmal were immune and gave double points as Dictators of the House.
 Four of noun finalists were evicted, five remaining became super-finalists on day 104.
 Super-final of Veliki Brat 2011 on day 106.

Controversy

Breaking the Isolation

The live eviction incident
One of the main rules of Veliki Brat was that contact with the outside world was forbidden and that no new information should enter the house. During the first live eviction, when Marijana Mićić (the host) talked to the house, Nemeš started to show off and provoke her. In response, she put him down by saying that she and all of the viewers from five different countries saw what had happened between him and Marijana Čvrljak (the housemate) the other night. This was the first time that information entered the house.

Slaven
During the 21st day, an intruder entered the house. Tamara recognized him as her boyfriend, Slaven. Slaven shouted at her from the rooftop, saying he was angry due to her flirting with Nikola Maurović and that they should break up. He also shouted insults and threatened Nikola, and told Marijana that everybody saw the sex scene and that her father had renounced her.

Fans commented that the whole situation might be staged, since the house security had never been breached before, and it would be impossible to climb the roof and not get caught by the guards.

Vladimir's ejection
During the show, Vladimir decided he wanted to leave, and Big Brother told him that he had to wait 24 hours, and if he did not change his mind, he would be able to leave the house (the standard procedure). Vladimir did not want to wait, so he started breaking the house rules. Hee started giving out information from the outside world to the other housemates and Big Brother ejected him.

Nemeš and Marijana hate groups
After hooking up with Nemeš, Marijana became a target of cyber-bullying. Many groups about them were created on Facebook, some with up to 28,000 members.

Fix speculation
Some of the contestants, claimed that the show was fixed. When interviewed by the press following eviction, some former contestants said that Marijana was promised to get the prize money if she had sex during her time in the house. Both the press and the fans noticed that on a number of occasions Marijana had said "Ja sam svoj zadatak ispunila.", which they thought related to her affair with Nemeš.

Speculation around the show was common in previous years, but when Marijana won, forums and even some columnists claimed that the winner was not decided by the public vote. In addition to this, Croatian broadcaster RTL Televizija published news that Marijana had won before the voting lines were closed.

References

External links
Production website (Serbian)
Official site for Serbia, Bosnia & Herzegovina, Macedonia and Montenegro (Serbian)
Official site for Croatia (Croatian)

2011 Serbian television seasons
2011